Franjo Fröhlich was a Yugoslav fencer. He competed in the individual sabre event at the 1928 Summer Olympics.

References

External links
 

Year of birth missing
Possibly living people
Yugoslav male sabre fencers
Olympic fencers of Yugoslavia
Fencers at the 1928 Summer Olympics